Wellington Marist AFC is an association football club in Wellington, New Zealand. The team is based at Kilbirnie Park in Kilbirnie.

History
Marist A.F.C. is one of the oldest football clubs in Wellington, having won the Chatham Cup in 1932 and 1946, and were runners-up in 1945. The team's home ground is at Kilbirnie Park in Wellington, also having training facilities at Melrose Park. Marist has teams in grades from Capital Division 2 right through to Capital 13 and Masters grades for the over 35 players.

Honours

Men's
  Capital Division 1
Winners (2): 2001, 2009
 Chatham Cup
Winners (2): 1932, 1946

Women's
 Central Premier Women's League
Winners (2): 2005, 2009, 2010
 Kelly Cup
Winners (2): 1995, 2010

References

External links
Marist AFC Website
Wellington Marist Facebook page

Association football clubs in Wellington
Sport in Wellington City
Association football clubs established in 1896
1896 establishments in New Zealand